Pain Mahalleh-ye Nalkiashar (also Romanized as Pā’īn Maḩalleh-ye Nālkīāshar) is a village in Divshal Rural District, in the Central District of Langarud County, Gilan Province, Iran. At the 2006 census, its population was 263, in 75 families.

References 

Populated places in Langarud County